Days Before Rodeo is the second mixtape by American rapper Travi$ Scott. It was released for free on August 18, 2014, by Grand Hustle Records. The mixtape features guest appearances from Young Thug, Big Sean, The 1975, Rich Homie Quan, Migos, T.I. and Peewee Longway.

Background and promotion
In August 2014, Scott announced on his Twitter account that he would be releasing 10 new songs within a month. On the same day, he also tweeted the title of this project, Days Before Rodeo, before marketing the countdown every day until it stopped on August 10, 2014. On August 17, 2014, Scott released the track list and artwork for this project.

The first song released from Days Before Rodeo was "Don't Play" featuring American rapper Big Sean and English pop band The 1975. The song was produced by Scott himself, along with Vinylz and Allen Ritter. Justin Davis of Complex commented Scott and Sean "have great chemistry over the track," while continuing their "streak of songs together". The Western-themed video for "Don't Play" was released on August 18, 2014.

Although Days Before Rodeo was a prelude to Rodeo, Scott tweeted that the project was not supposed to be taken as a mixtape, but as an album.

Release
Days Before Rodeo was released on August 18, 2014. Scott called it a "free album" via Twitter on the following day. Eric Diep of XXL commented the album "displays the Houston rapper's eclectic production style, as well as his boastful raps that are similar to his mentors Kanye West and T.I.", while calling it "some great new material that we've been missing from him since his excellent debut, Owl Pharaoh." Days Before Rodeo is a prequel to Scott's Grand Hustle and Epic Records debut album Rodeo, which was released on September 4, 2015.

Singles
On July 11, 2014, Scott released the mixtape's lead single, titled "Don't Play", which features guest appearances from The 1975 and Big Sean.

On December 2, 2014, Scott released the mixtape's second single, titled "Mamacita", which features guest appearances from Rich Homie Quan and Young Thug.

Critical reception

Days Before Rodeo was met with acclaim from music critics and fans. The album has a user rating of 96% on HotNewHipHop. Jacob Roy from Thefourohfive' sums up critical response for this album "While some may feel he opts for style over substance, all the distorted baselines and 'straight up' ad-libs play a purpose and a role. Days Before Rodeo proves Travis does everything for a reason. When listening to the album each song plays a role and as a whole it makes for a incredibly engrossing experience. While his lyrical ability may be questioned, it doesn't really cross your mind when you are in awe of the piece that he has painted for you. He has a mission statement and he is going to stick by it. 'We will understand it if they don't, we don't want they bullshit no more.' It wouldn't be a stretch to say Travi$ Scott could be at the forefront for a new generation of hip-hop that have their eyes on the bigger picture."

Track listing

Notes
  signifies a co-producer.
 "Quintana Pt. 2" features uncredited vocals from T.I.
 "Grey" features background vocals from James Fauntleroy.

Sample credits
 "Days Before Rodeo: The Prayer" contains a sample of Philip Glass's original composition "Music Box (Opening Theme)".
 "Don't Play" contains an interpolation of "M.O.N.E.Y.", written and performed by The 1975.
 "Mamacita" contains a sample of "(If Loving You Is Wrong) I Don't Want to Be Right", written and performed by Bobby "Blue" Bland.
 "Sloppy Toppy" contains a sample of "Spend the Night With Me", written and performed by Edna Wright.
 "Backyard" contains a sample of "Distant Lover (Live at Oakland Coliseum, CA, 1974)", written and performed by Marvin Gaye.

References 

2014 mixtape albums
Albums produced by DJ Dahi
Albums produced by Lex Luger
Albums produced by Mike Dean (record producer)
Grand Hustle Records albums
Albums produced by Lil' C (record producer)
Albums produced by Travis Scott
Albums produced by Vinylz
Albums produced by Metro Boomin
Albums produced by Southside (record producer)
Albums produced by FKi (production team)
Albums produced by WondaGurl
Travis Scott albums
Albums produced by Allen Ritter